Musicology is the scholarly study of music. It may also refer to:
 Musicology (album), a 2004 album by Prince
 "Musicology" (song), the title song from the Prince album
 Musicology Tour (also known as Musicology Live2004ever), a 2004 North American tour by Prince